The Norwegian Directorate of Mining with the Commissioner of Mines at Svalbard is a Norwegian government agency responsible for administrating the extraction of mineral resources within the kingdom. The directorate is subordinate to the Ministry of Trade and Industry and co-located with the Norwegian Geological Survey in Trondheim, with a separate office in Longyearbyen.

A total of 18 employees see to the administration of mining legislation, registering claims, approving mine plans and supervising the extractive industry. It is also the supervisory authority concerning environmental impact assessment for planned extraction.

History
The directorate was created in 1986 when the five mining authority districts were merged into one agency. This process was concluded in 1994. From 2003 the Commission er Mines at Svalbard was merged into the directorate.

References

Government agencies of Norway
Mining law and governance
Mining in Norway
Politics of Svalbard